Port San Luis is a harbor located on the central coast of California, approximately  north of Avila Beach in San Luis Obispo County. The harbor is managed by the Port San Luis Harbor District which is responsible for maintaining the surrounding tidelands and beaches. Originally acting as a major port for oil exports, the harbor serves as a recreational area and is used by boaters and researchers to study and appreciate the local marine life.

History
In 1873, John Harford constructed the Harford pier in order to allow for the shipment of goods and passengers to nearby San Luis Obispo.  The pier was connected to a railroad and, by the late 1870s, included a hotel for passengers waiting to embark on ships arriving at the pier. In the late 1800s, construction began on a breakwater to provide further protection for the pier. By 1890, the Point San Luis Lighthouse was constructed on a bluff above the harbor.

In 1910, Union Oil began using the port to export oil extracted from the San Joaquin Valley. This new trade led to the construction of additional piers and railroads, with oil exports continuing to expand well into the 1920s. With the onset of the Great Depression oil exports ceased and the port fell into disuse, with Harford pier being demolished. However, with the arrival of World War II, the port became important once again, acting as a supplying station for U.S. naval vessels.

In 1954, voters in San Luis Obispo County, California approved the creation of a harbor district to conserve and maintain the port's facilities and its surrounding tidelands. In 1955, the California State Legislature granted the harbor district the surrounding tidelands in trust. In 1984, the Legislature also granted the district a trust over Avila Beach.

Features
The harbor serves as a mooring point for recreational sailing and fishing boats. Visitors are also able to camp at the port in recreational vehicles and can hike up to the nearby lighthouse. 

The harbor is also used as research and educational facility for nearby California Polytechnic State University, San Luis Obispo's Center for Coastal Marine Sciences.

References

Ports and harbors of California
Beaches of San Luis Obispo County, California